Rubbra is a surname. Notable people with the surname include:

 Arthur Rubbra (1903–1982), English engineer
 Edmund Rubbra (1901–1986), British composer